Xiropotamos is a village of the Volvi municipality. Before the 2011 local government reform it was part of the municipality of Arethousa. The 2011 census recorded 350 inhabitants in the village. Xiropotamos is a part of the community of Filadelfio.

Notable people
Charalambos Makridis

See also
 List of settlements in the Thessaloniki regional unit

References

Populated places in Thessaloniki (regional unit)